The 2018–19 South Florida Bulls men's basketball team represented the University of South Florida during the 2018–19 NCAA Division I men's basketball season. The season marked the 47th basketball season for USF, the sixth as a member of the American Athletic Conference, and the second season under head coach Brian Gregory. The Bulls played their home games at Yuengling Center on the university's Tampa, Florida campus. They finished the season 24–14, 8–10 in AAC play to finish in a tie for seventh place. They lost in the first round of the AAC tournament to UConn. They were invited to the College Basketball Invitational where they defeated Stony Brook, Utah Valley, and Loyola Marymount to advance to the best-of-three finals vs DePaul. They defeated DePaul 2 games to 1 to become CBI champions.

Previous season
The Bulls finished the 2017–18 season 10–22, 3–15 in AAC play to finish in last place. As the No. 12 seed in the AAC tournament, they lost in the first round to Memphis.

Offseason

Departures

Incoming transfers

2018 recruiting class

Roster

Schedule and results

|-
!colspan=9 style=| Exhibition

|-
!colspan=9 style=|Regular season

|-
!colspan=9 style=| AAC tournament

|-
!colspan=9 style=| College Basketball Invitational

References

South Florida Bulls men's basketball seasons
South Florida Bulls
South Florida Bulls men's b
South Florida Bulls men's b
South Florida
College Basketball Invitational championship seasons